The Soviet deportations from Bessarabia and Northern Bukovina took place between late 1940 and 1951 and were part of Joseph Stalin's policy of political repression of the potential opposition to the Soviet power (see Population transfer in the Soviet Union). The deported were typically moved to so-called "special settlements" (спецпоселения) (see Involuntary settlements in the Soviet Union).

The deportations began after the Soviet occupation of Bessarabia and northern Bukovina, which occurred in June 1940. According to a secret Soviet Ministry of Interior report dated December 1965, 46,000 people were deported from the Moldavian Soviet Socialist Republic for the period 1940−1953.

1940–1941
As a result of the Molotov–Ribbentrop Pact of August 1939, the Romanian government was forced to accept the Soviet ultimatum of June 26, 1940, and withdrew from Bessarabia and Northern Bukovina. These regions (as well as the Hertsa region) were then incorporated into the Soviet Union, most of the former being organized as the Moldavian SSR, while the other areas were attributed to the Ukrainian SSR.

On June 12–13, 1941, 29,839 members of families of "counter-revolutionaries and nationalists" from the Moldavian SSR, and from the Chernivtsi (of Northern Bukovina) and Izmail oblasts of the Ukrainian SSR were deported to Kazakhstan, the Komi ASSR, the Krasnoyarsk Krai, and the Omsk and Novosibirsk oblasts. For the fate of such a deportee from Bessarabia, see the example of Eufrosinia Kersnovskaya. The Georgian NKVD official Sergo Goglidze, trusted henchman of Lavrentiy Beria, was in charge of these deportations from Bessarabia and Northern Bukovina.

Labor mobilization
During 1940 and 1941, 53,356 people from Bessarabia and Northern Bukovina were mobilized for labour across the entire territory of the Soviet Union; though the mobilization was presented as voluntary, refusal to work could result in penal punishment, and living and working conditions were generally poor.

Aftermath
Professor Rudolph Rummel, based on older claims, estimated that in 1940–1941, 200,000 to 300,000 Romanian Bessarabians were persecuted, conscripted into forced labor camps, or deported with the entire family, of whom 18,000 to 57,000 did not survive. According to some estimates (as related by historian Pavel Moraru), 12% of the population of the two provinces was killed and deported in one year. 

Such figures were not confirmed after the opening of Soviet archives: historian Igor Cașu indicated a figure of 86,604 people from Bessarabia, Northern Bukovina, and Hertsa Region who suffered political repression in 1940-1941, the greater part (53,000) being subjected to forced conscription for labour across the Soviet Union. Among the cca. 30,000 deportees, there were representatives from all ethnic groups: Romanians, Ukrainians, Russians, Jews, Bulgarians, Gagauz. Moldovans and Romanians comprised 50% of these, a proportion similar with their weight in the general population, leading Cașu to conclude that the prewar and postwar repressions were not directed at any specific ethnic or national group.

1942
On  June 22, 1941, Nazi Germany, together with several other countries, including Romania (which had the primary objective of reintegrating Bessarabia and Northern Bukovina into the Romanian state), attacked the Soviet Union (see Operation Barbarossa). After the start of the war, further deportations occurred in the USSR. In April 1942, Romanian deportees and some other nationalities were deported again from Crimea and the North Caucasus. In June 1942, Romanians and others were also deported from Krasnodar Krai and the Rostov Oblast.

1949
On April 6, 1949, the Political Bureau of the Central Committee issued decision number 1290-467cc, which called for 11,280 families from Moldavian SSR to be deported as kulaks or collaborators with Nazi Germany during World War II. Ultimately, 11,239 families, comprising 35,050 people were detained and deported on July 6, 1949, with the rest either escaping or being exempt due to their contribution to the Soviet war effort or their support for collectivisation. In an interpellation in the Parliament of Romania in 2009, international judge and politician Tudor Panțîru put the number of deportees from July 6–7 at 40,000.

1951

On February 19, 1951, Viktor Abakumov delivered to Stalin a secret notice which listed the planned numbers of deported "Jehovists" from Ukraine, Belorussia, Estonia, Latvia, Lithuania and Moldova, with 1,675 people (670 families) listed for the latter. On March 3, the USSR Council of Ministers issued the corresponding decree, followed by an order of the Ministry of State Security of February 6. On March 24, the Council of Ministers of the Moldavian SSR issued the decree on the confiscation and selling of the property of the deportees. Operation North started at 4:00 am on April 1, 1951, and the round-ups continued until April 2. The deportees were classified as "special settlers". In total, from the Moldavian SSR, there were 723 families (2,617 people) deported on the night of March 31 to April 1, 1951, all members of neoprotestant sects, mostly Jehovah's Witnesses, and qualified as religious elements considered a potential danger for the Communist regime. In the previously mentioned interpellation, Panțîru claimed some 6,000 ethnic Romanians from the Moldavian SSR were deported to Central Asia on April 1, 1951.

Legacy
 Association of former deportees and political detainees

Memorial
A memorial to the victims of Stalinist repression has been erected in Chișinău, close to Central Station, to commemorate the deportations.

Gallery

See also
Vorkuta uprising
Romanian prisoners of war in the Soviet Union
Commission for the Study of the Communist Dictatorship in Moldova

References

Bibliography

Victor Bârsan, Masacrul inocenților, Bucharest, 1993, pp. 18–19
Anton Antonov-Ovseenko, "The Time of Stalin", Harper and Row (in English)
Johann Urwich-Ferry, "Ohne Passdurch die UdSSR", Editura "Gruparea Româno-Germană de studii", München, 1976–1978 (in German) "Fără pașaport prin URSS. Amintiri", Editura Eminescu, București, 1999 (in Romanian)

Soviet occupation of Bessarabia and Northern Bukovina
Deportation
Bessarabia 
Political repression in the Soviet Union
Political and cultural purges
Moldavian Soviet Socialist Republic
History of Budjak
History of Chernivtsi Oblast
Romania in World War II
Communism in Moldova
Crimes against humanity